Peter H. Seeberger (born  November 14, 1966 in Nuremberg) is a German chemist.

Biography 
Seeberger studied chemistry at the University of Erlangen-Nuremberg. He completed his Ph.D. in biochemistry in 1995 as a Fulbright scholar at the University of Colorado at Boulder. After being a post-doctoral fellow at Sloan Kettering Institute for Cancer Research in New York, he became assistant professor at Massachusetts Institute of Technology (MIT) in 1998, where he was promoted to Firmenich Associate Professor of Chemistry  in 2002.

Starting 2003 he was a professor of organic chemistry at the department of chemistry and applied biosciences at ETH Zurich as well as an affiliate professor at Burnham Institute in La Jolla, California. Since the summer of 2008 he is one of the directors of Max Planck Institute of Colloids and Interfaces in Golm, near Potsdam, where is the head of the department of biomolecular systems. Seeberger is a   specialist in the area of glycomics.

His awards include Klung Wilhelmy Science Award,  which he has received in 2007, Körber European Science Prize, received in 2004, Claude S. Hudson Award, received in 2009, Humanity in Science Award, received in 2015 and Stifterverband Science Prize, received in 2017. Since May 2011 he is the Editor-in-Chief of Beilstein Journal of Organic Chemistry. In 2013 he was elected a member of the Berlin-Brandenburg Academy of Sciences and Humanities.

Literature 
 Catarina Pietschmann: Zuckerketten aus dem Automaten, in: MaxPlanckForschung Band 2/2013, pages 54–59, online

References

External links 
 Web site of Peter H. Seeberger
 Information about Peter Seeberger at the web site of Max Planck Society
 

1966 births
Living people
21st-century German chemists
University of Erlangen-Nuremberg alumni
University of Colorado Boulder alumni
Massachusetts Institute of Technology School of Science faculty
Academic staff of ETH Zurich
Scientists from Nuremberg
Max Planck Institute directors